The sexual abuse scandal in San Diego diocese is a significant episode in the series of Catholic sex abuse cases in the United States and Ireland.

Abuse cases occurring before 1990
Diocesan officials acknowledged that these cases, except for a few, were legitimate and mostly occurred before 1990.  The few that were not considered legitimate were placed in the global settlement and, due to the settlement, will not be challenged.

Attempt to file for bankruptcy
On February 27, 2007, the Diocese of San Diego filed for Chapter 11 protection, hours before the first of about 150 lawsuits was due to be heard. San Diego became the largest diocese to file for bankruptcy.

198 million dollar settlement
On September 7, 2007, The Roman Catholic Diocese of San Diego agreed to pay $198.1 million to settle 144 claims of sexual abuse by clergy, the 2nd-largest payment by a diocese, terminating four years of settlement talks in state and federal courts.

Allegations against the bishop
Robert Brom was accused of coercing a student into a sexual relationship at a seminary in Minnesota, where he once was rector and later headed the Diocese of Duluth. The alleged victim reportedly claimed that the incident of abuse occurred "in a coffin along with other bishops". Due to the "unusual" allegation, no criminal charges were brought at the time and, according to Brom, the settlement was made to offer psychological assistance for the alleged victim.

See also

Abuse
Charter for the Protection of Children and Young People
Child abuse
Child sexual abuse
Essential Norms
National Review Board
Pontifical Commission for the Protection of Minors
Religious abuse
Sexual abuse
Sexual misconduct
Spiritual abuse

References

External links
Audits, Child And Youth Protection; US Conference of Catholic Bishops
Charter For The Protection Of Children And Young People; US Conference of Catholic Bishops
Child And Youth Protection; US Conference of Catholic Bishops 
Database of Publicly Accused Priests in the United States
National Review Board,  Child And Youth Protection; US Conference of Catholic Bishops
Safe Environment, Child And Youth Protection; US Conference of Catholic Bishops 
Victim Assistance, Child And Youth Protection; US Conference of Catholic Bishops

Incidents of violence against boys
History of San Diego
San Diego
Roman Catholic Diocese of San Diego